Sandleford Priory may refer to:

Sandleford Priory (monastery)
Sandleford Priory (country house)
St Gabriel's School